John McCourtney (born 15 November 1943) was a British wrestler. He competed in the men's freestyle 63 kg at the 1968 Summer Olympics. John McCourtney died on April 9th 2022.

References

External links
 

1943 births
Living people
British male sport wrestlers
Olympic wrestlers of Great Britain
Wrestlers at the 1968 Summer Olympics
Sportspeople from Glasgow